William Edward Smith (born December 31, 1959, in Boise, Idaho) is a United States district judge of the United States District Court for the District of Rhode Island and a former federal judicial nominee to the United States Court of Appeals for the First Circuit.

Background
Smith received his Bachelor of Arts degree from Georgetown University in 1982 and his Juris Doctor cum laude from Georgetown University Law Center in 1987.

He was in private practice in Providence, Rhode Island, from 1987 until 2000. From 1993 until 1998, he was also a part-time judge in the town of West Warwick. Smith was the staff director of the Rhode Island office of United States Senator Lincoln Chafee from 2000 until 2001. From 2001 to 2002, he returned to private practice in Providence.

From 2001 to 2002, Smith was an adjunct professor at Providence College. He currently teaches as an adjunct professor at Roger Williams University School of Law.

District court service

Smith was nominated by President George W. Bush on July 18, 2002, to a seat on the United States District Court for the District of Rhode Island vacated by Ronald R. Lagueux. He was confirmed by the United States Senate on November 14, 2002, and received his commission on the next day. He became chief judge on November 30, 2013, and served until November 30, 2019.

First Circuit nomination under Bush
Smith was nominated on December 6, 2007, by President George W. Bush to a seat on the United States Court of Appeals for the First Circuit vacated by Judge Bruce Marshall Selya, who took senior status on December 31, 2006. Rhode Island's two Democratic senators, Jack Reed and Sheldon Whitehouse, both of whom had been cut out of Smith's selection by the White House, issued a lukewarm joint response to the nomination: "Before giving someone a lifetime appointment to the federal bench we need to carefully review their record. We will be sure to give Judge Smith’s nomination thorough and independent review." Previously, Whitehouse had suggested in September 2007 that the Senate should not consider any Bush appointment for the First Circuit that late in the president’s term. Smith's nomination was not confirmed.

References

Sources

1959 births
Living people
Georgetown University alumni
Georgetown University Law Center alumni
Judges of the United States District Court for the District of Rhode Island
People from Boise, Idaho
Providence College faculty
United States district court judges appointed by George W. Bush
21st-century American judges